"You Can't Always Get What You Want" is a song by the English rock band the Rolling Stones on their 1969 album Let It Bleed. Written by Mick Jagger and Keith Richards, it was named as the 100th greatest song of all time by Rolling Stone magazine in its 2004 list of the "500 Greatest Songs of All Time" before dropping a place the following year.

Composition and recording
Jagger commented on the song's beginnings:

"You Can't Always Get What You Want" was composed in the key of C major and was the first song recorded for the album. It exists in two versions, a 4:51 single mix and a 7:28 album mix.  "You Can't Always Get What You Want" was recorded on 16 and 17 November 1968 at Olympic Sound Studios in London. It features the London Bach Choir opening the song (the choir opening is only on the album version), highlighting throughout, and bringing it to its conclusion. Al Kooper plays piano and organ, as well as the French horn intro, while Rocky Dijon plays congas, maracas and tambourine.

In his review of the song, Richie Unterberger of AllMusic said: "If you buy John Lennon's observation that the Rolling Stones were apt to copy the Beatles' innovations within a few months or so, 'You Can't Always Get What You Want' is the Rolling Stones' counterpart to 'Hey Jude'." Jagger said in 1969, "I liked the way the Beatles did that with 'Hey Jude'. The orchestra was not just to cover everything up—it was something extra. We may do something like that on the next album."

Lyrics
The three verses (and the varied theme of the fourth verse) address major topics of the 1960s: love, politics, and drugs. Each verse captures the essence of the initial optimism and eventual disillusion, followed by the resigned pragmatism of the chorus.

Unterberger elaborated: 

Jimmy Hutmaker of Excelsior, Minnesota claimed to be the "Mr. Jimmy" cited in the song and that he said the phrase "you can't always get what you want" to Jagger during a chance encounter at an Excelsior drug store in 1964. However, David Dalton, a writer for Rolling Stone who witnessed the filming of The Rolling Stones Rock and Roll Circus, claims in his commentary for the DVD of the concert that "Mr. Jimmy" refers to Miller, the Stones producer from 1968 to 1973.

Marianne Faithfull has also claimed a role: "Obviously I also contributed to 'You Can't Always Get What You Want' and 'Dear Doctor' – junk songs... I know they used me as a muse for those tough drug songs. I knew I was being used but it was for a worthy cause."

Release and aftermath
The song was originally released on the B-side of "Honky Tonk Women" in July 1969. Although it did not chart at the time, London Records re-serviced the single in 1973 and "You Can't Always Get What You Want" reached number 42 on the Billboard Hot 100 and number 34 on the Cashbox Top 100 Singles chart. One of the Stones' most popular recordings, it has since appeared on the compilations Hot Rocks, Singles Collection (single version), Forty Licks, Rolled Gold+: The Very Best of the Rolling Stones (2007 edition), Singles 1968-1971 (single version), Slow Rollers (single version) and GRRR! (single version).

Live recordings appear on the albums Love You Live, Flashpoint, Live Licks, Brussels Affair, Hyde Park Live, and Havana Moon, as well as on The Rolling Stones Rock and Roll Circus, filmed in 1968.  Stones concert films that contain the song include: Ladies and Gentlemen: The Rolling Stones, [[L.A. Friday|From the Vault – L.A Forum - Live in 1975]], Let's Spend the Night Together, Stones at the Max, Bridges to Babylon Tour '97–98, Four Flicks, The Biggest Bang, Sweet Summer Sun: Hyde Park Live, and Havana Moon''.

The song was performed live with members of Voce Chamber Choir and London Youth Choir for the Stones' 2012 shows in London, November 25 and November 29. The same choir also performed on the track at Glastonbury and two performances at Hyde Park in 2013.

Trump campaign use
Donald Trump played the Rolling Stones' recording of the song at campaign appearances during the 2016 Republican primaries and the presidential election, including his nationally televised acceptance speech at the Republican National Convention in July. Although the campaign had attained a blanket licence from ASCAP, after the convention, the band said publicly that they do not endorse Trump and requested that he cease all use of their songs immediately. Despite the requests to stop, Trump continued using the song at campaign rallies before and after the 2016 election. According to Jagger, the band considers the use of the song as a play-out at rallies to be "odd," given that it is a "sort of doomy ballad about drugs in Chelsea." The Trump campaign continued to use the song during 2020, the most recent use being to close his political rally in Tulsa, Oklahoma on June 20, 2020. Trump was again warned by the Stones not to use their music. They said they were working with the performing rights organisation, BMI to prevent unauthorised use. The Trump campaign stopped using the song soon after and began playing "Y.M.C.A." by Village People to end his rallies instead.

Personnel
The Rolling Stones
Mick Jagger – vocals
Keith Richards – acoustic and electric guitars, backing vocals
Bill Wyman – bass guitar

Additional personnel
London Bach Choir – choral arrangements by Jack Nitzsche
Al Kooper – piano, organ, French horn
Jimmy Miller – drums
Rocky Dijon – congas, maracas, tambourine
Madeline Bell – backing vocals
Nanette Workman – backing vocals (credited as 'Nanette Newman' on the LP)
Doris Troy – backing vocals

Charts

Certifications

References

The Rolling Stones songs
1969 songs
1969 singles
Songs written by Jagger–Richards
Rock ballads
Song recordings produced by Jimmy Miller
Decca Records singles
London Records singles
Chrysalis Records singles
1960s ballads
Songs about drugs
Donald Trump 2016 presidential campaign
Songs about London